Ghost of the Robot (GOTR) are a California-based rock band. Among the original band members are James Marsters (vocals/guitar), Charlie De Mars (guitar/vocals) and Kevin McPherson (bass). Rounding out the group are Sullivan Marsters (guitar/vocals) and Jordan Latham (drums).

Ghost 1.0
The band recorded two albums, Mad Brilliant (2003) and B-Sider (2004), before going on hiatus in 2005.

Ghost 2.0
They reunited in October 2010 at the very club in Santa Monica, where they had played their first show. This was followed by the release of their studio album Murphy's Law (2012), and a European Tour. Ghost of the Robot has continued to develop their sound. James Marsters adds, "The other thing about this new incarnation is that I'm very excited about Charlie singing his songs… We've always had the Beatles as a touchstone; the Beatles had no real lead singer but passed around lead vocals… And so when we're all singing together, it's really hard to tell who's who. It really mixes beautifully.”

Since 2013 they have played clubs and music festivals in Sacramento, Portland, San Diego, Philadelphia, Chicago, and Atlanta, and concerts that were streamed live from studios in Lake Tahoe and Sacramento, CA, to fans all over the world.

Ghost of the Robot has four albums to their credit. Alongside the latest Murphy's Law and Bourgeois Faux Pas, they've re-released their earlier albums Mad Brilliant and B-Sider. They are currently in the studio creating their fifth album Pair of Bulls Part 1.

Catalog availability
All of their EPs and singles are released by EyeLAshout on iTunes and Amazon.

Performances and media appearances

Influences

 Nirvana
 Weezer
 Bob Dylan
 The Beatles
 David Bowie
 Rolling Stones
 Pavement
 Ben Folds
 Pink Floyd
 Muse
 Radiohead
 Women
 Amsterdam

Band members

Current members:
Charlie De Mars – guitar and vocals
James Marsters – guitar and vocals
Jordan Latham - drums
Kevin McPherson – bass
Sullivan Marsters – guitar and vocals
Eddie Underwood - lead guitar
Past members:
Steven Sellers – keyboard and backing vocals (died February 21, 2009)
Aaron Anderson – drums (2003-2004)

Timeline

Discography

Albums
Mad Brilliant (2003)
"Liar" (Duration: 2:54 minutes)
"Vehicles Shock Me" (Duration: 4:42 minutes)
"Dangerous" (Duration: 2:54 minutes)
"David Letterman" (Duration: 3:28 minutes)
"Angel" (Duration: 2:00 minutes)
"Valerie" (Single) (Duration: 2:37 minutes)
"Mad Brilliant" (Duration: 1:45 minutes)
"Call 911" (Duration: 4:34 minutes)
"Blocking Brainwaves" (Duration: 3:46 minutes)
"German. Jewish." (Duration: 4:00 minutes)
"Goodnight Sweet Girl" (Duration: 4:55 minutes)

B-Sider (2011)
"Goodbye" (Duration: 2:05 minutes)
"Sounds Like A Personal Problem" (Duration: 3:59 minutes)
"Méfiant" (Duration: 6:31 minutes)
"New Man" (Duration: 5:22 minutes)
"Country Live In" (Duration: 4:19 minutes)
"It's Nothing" (EP) (Duration: 3:06 minutes)
"Runaway" (Duration: 3:51 minutes)
"This Town" (Duration: 3:16 minutes)
"Pre-War" (Duration: 3:48 minutes)
"The End" (Un-released) (Duration: 4:01 minutes)

'Murphy's Law (2011)"Go Luck Yourself!" (Duration: 2:41 minutes)
"One Love, One Exception" (Duration: 3:04 minutes)
"Too Fast" (Duration: 2:32 minutes)
"Alone Cowboy song" (Duration: 2:23 minutes)
"Truth Is" (Duration: 2:50 minutes)
"Blind Eyes" (Duration: 2:50 minutes)
"Is Shoes" (Duration: 3:15 minutes)
"Smile" (Duration: 3:17 minutes)
"Moonshot" (Duration: 4:23 minutes)
"Strippers" (Duration: 2:41 minutes)
"Finer Than Gold" (Duration: 2:50 minutes)
"If This Is Love" (Duration: 4:34 minutes)
"Transferring Energy" (Duration: 3:53 minutes)
"Men Who Die" (Duration: 2:59 minutes)
"Figures" (Duration: 4:31 minutes)
"The Key" (Duration: 2:57 minutes)Bourgeois Faux Pas (2015)"Hello (Album Version)" (Duration: 4:40 minutes)
"Back To Act Too" (Duration: 2:10 minutes)
"Three" (Duration: 3:12 minutes)
"Mother Of Peril" (Duration: 4:16 minutes)
"Bad" (Duration: 3:45 minutes)
"All That She Wanted" (Duration: 2:46 minutes)
"Why Do We Love?" (Duration: 2:59 minutes)
"Katie" (Duration: 3:28 minutes)
"The Weight" (Duration: 2:59 minutes)
"Fall Away" (Duration: 4:10 minutes)
"Dark Matter" (Duration: 3:55 minutes)Pair of Bulls, Vol. 1 (2018)"Heart Attack" (Duration: 3:25 minutes)
More Than Free (Duration: 2:51 minutes)
Fall of Night (Duration: 3:33 minutes)
Epic Harm Us (Duration: 3:29 minutes)
Alone (Duration: 2:39 minutes)
Light + Sound (Duration: 2:06 minutes)
Vandals (Duration: 2:49 minutes)
Dance Slow (Duration: 1:55 minutes)
Man 1 (Duration: 3:19 minutes)
Jaded (Duration: 3:08 minutes)
Musica Universalis (Duration: 3:15 minutes)

EPs and singles
It's Nothing EP (2004)
"It's Nothing"
"Runaway"
"Pre-War"
"This Town"
"She Likes Rap Grooves" (Featuring Ice Berg, Rockmaninoff and Sir-Rock)'David Letterman (2003)"David Letterman"
"Sounds Like a Personal Problem"
"Mefiant"Valerie (2003)"Valerie"
"Goodbye"Hello (Single) (2014)'''

References

Sources
  Retrieved August 3, 2011
 https://web.archive.org/web/20110830053424/http://sunnydale-la.webs.com/jamesmarsters-fanpage/gotr/ Retrieved May 11, 2011
 http://www.sing365.com/music/lyric.nsf/Ghost-Of-The-Robot-Biography/FC43E3CFC5D7E61C48256D450013E87D Retrieved May 11, 2011
  Retrieved December 28, 2011
 Mad Brilliant de Ghost of the Robot en Apple Music. (1970, January 1). Retrieved March 23, 2017, from 
 Ghost of the Robot | Official Website. (2012). Official Website | Discography. Retrieved March 23, 2017, from 
 Bourgeois Faux Pas by Ghost of the Robot on Apple Music. (2015, September 19). Retrieved March 23, 2017, from 
 B-Sider by Ghost of the Robot on Apple Music. (1970, January 1). Retrieved March 23, 2017, from

External links
 

Alternative rock groups from California
Musical groups established in 2002
Musical groups disestablished in 2004
Musical groups reestablished in 2010